Bernardus Stefanus Henricus (Ben) Zegers (Utrecht, 3 March 1962) is a Dutch visual artist, active as a sculptor and installation artist,<ref name="RKD">Ben Zegers; male / Dutch; sculptor, installation artist, at rkd.nl. Last updated 2019-06-18.</ref> and teacher and coordinator at the Gerrit Rietveld Academy.

Zegers came into prominence with sculptures, that balances between sculpture and functional design. His early work was told to "alienate household items, especially mattresses, but also chairs and tables, and places them in the useless and meaningful sculptural context."

 Biography 
 Education and early career 
He then continued his studies for two years at the Ateliers '63 in Haarlem from 1986 to 1988.

In 1988 Zegers settled as a visual artist in Rotterdam, where he has lived and worked ever since. In that year the Prins Bernhard Cultuurfonds Zegers and five other young artists Giny Vos, Nicolaas de Haan, Agnes Roelofse, Hans van Bentem, and Trudi van den Berg were granted an assignment to get their professional practice started.Art-eds. "Opdracht jonge kunstenaars". "Het Parool". Amsterdam, 1988/12/28, p. 17.

In 1988 he had his first solo exhibition in the Teylers Museum, Haarlem. In 1989 he was one of the 25 Dutch contemporary artists at the Edinburgh Festival. His work was engaged that year into the city collection of Rotterdam at Museum Boymans Van Beuningen together with the work of other young artist, that had settled in Rotterdam; Geert van de Camp, Allard Budding, and Lidwien van de Ven.

In 1990 he participated in group exhibitions at Galerie Van Krimpen and Galerie Fons Welters in Amsterdam and at Museum Boymans Van Beuningen in Rotterdam, where he regularly returned. He was awarded the Charlotte Köhler Prize in 1994.

 Later career 
In 1991 Zeger was selected with Ab van Hanegem, Aernout Mik, Kaap, and Lidwien van de Ven for the São Paulo Art Biennial,Aad Kruijning, "Nederlandse presentatie op Biënnale toont eigen gezicht," de Telegraaf, 1991/05/24, p. 16. Eventually the Dutch contribution was redrawn, and ended up at an art fair in Los Angeles.

In the new millennium Zegers also started as sculpture teacher and coordinator at the Gerrit Rietveld Academy in Amsterdam. The works of Zegers are among others in the city collection of the Museum Boymans Van Beuningen in Rotterdam, and in public spaces in Rotterdam, Oostzaan, and Dokkum.

In 1990 Zegers was granted an encouragement award by the Amsterdams Fonds voor de Kunst, and in 1993 he received a Charlotte Köhler Price.

 Exhibitions, a selection 
 1989. International Festival, Edinburgh.Ed. "Nederlandse kunst present in Edinburgh," De Volkskrant. 's-Hertogenbosch, 1989/08/05, p. 9.
 1990. Rotterdam Assorti, Hal Building, Rotterdam
 1990. First Blossom, Galerie Van Krimpen, Amsterdam.Mark Peters, "Van Krimpen: Ben Zegers". de Volkskrant, 's-Hertogenbosch, 1990/04/07, p. 11.
 1990. Collected Works '2, Museum Boymans van Beuningen, Rotterdam.
 1990. MultipleChoice, Galerie Fons Welters, Amsterdam.
 1990. Mixed Company solo exhibition, Kunstmuseum Den Haag, The Hague.
 1991. São Paulo Art Biennial 1993. Verwandtschaften exhibition, Kunsthal Rotterdam.
 1993. Look Alike: Ben Zegers. Museum Boymans-van Beuningen Rotterdam November 21, 1993/31 January 1994. Museum Boymans-van Beuningen, 1993.
 2000. Ettre(s) a mon père. Kunsthal Rotterdam.

 Photo gallery 

 Publications 
 Zegers, Ben. Ben Zegers: Museum Boymans-van Beuningen Rotterdam November 21, 1993/31 January 1994''. Museum Boymans-van Beuningen, 1993.

References

External links 
 benzegers.nl website

1962 births
Living people
Dutch sculptors